Is This Hyperreal? is the fourth studio album from Atari Teenage Riot, and their first album since they effectively disbanded in 2000. It is the first ATR album featuring CX KiDTRONiK, and the first album without former vocalists Hanin Elias and the late Carl Crack.

Track listing

Notes
The single version of "Black Flags" features vocals from Boots Riley.

Reception

The album received mixed to positive reviews from critics. Metacritic assigned it an average score of 65 out of 100, based on 13 reviews.

References

External links
Atari Teenage Riot on Myspace
Official Digital Hardcore Recordings site

2011 albums
Atari Teenage Riot albums